The 1866 State of the Union Address was given by Andrew Johnson, the 17th president of the United States, on Monday, December 3, 1866.  It was not a spoken address, but a written one. The Reconstruction Era had begun, and Johnson wanted a policy that pardoned the leaders of the Confederate States of America. He began with, "In all of the States civil authority has superseded the coercion of arms, and the people, by their voluntary action, are maintaining their governments in full activity and complete operation." In the middle, he said,"In our efforts to preserve "the unity of government which constitutes as one people" by restoring the States to the condition which they held prior to the rebellion, we should be cautious, lest, having rescued our nation from perils of threatened disintegration, we resort to consolidation, and in the end absolute despotism, as a remedy for the recurrence of similar troubles." The rebellion he is referring to is the American Civil War, which ended in 1865.

References

State of the Union addresses
Presidency of Andrew Johnson
39th United States Congress
State of the Union Address
State of the Union Address
State of the Union Address
December 1866 events
State of the Union